Kasino is a eurodance group from Brazil. The group consists of Fher Cassini. Conceived to be only a studio project, Kasino rose to fame after the sudden inclusion of their first single "Can't Get Over" on the official soundtrack of the telenovela América. Quickly the music became a hit in Brazil. Some people who knew the group did not know that it was composed by Brazilians. According to ECAD, "Can't Get Over" was the 18th most played song in Southern Brazil between January and March 2006 and the 6th most played song in Northern Brazil between January and March 2006. Another successful song was "Shake It", which was the 14th most played song in the South of Brazil between April and June 2007. Other songs that were featured on soap opera tracks were "Sexy Baby", in Sabor da Paixão, in 2003, and "Shake It ", in Páginas da Vida, 2006.

Background 
In 2014, the group Kasino returned with the former voice of Fher Cassini, with the single "So Free", which was recorded at Eclips studio, and released on March 6, 2014.

The musical project Kasino is still well remembered on social networks, especially for a video of the group performing on the Sabadaço program, hosted by Gilberto Barros.

See also
 List of Eurodance artists

References 

Brazilian electronic music groups
Eurodance groups
Musical groups established in 2003
Musical groups from São Paulo